Endophilin-A2 is a protein that in humans is encoded by the SH3GL1 gene.

References

Further reading